Luis Alandy Ferrer IV (born December 12) is a Filipino politician who is currently holding the position as the mayor of the City of General Trias since 2022. He previously held the office from 2004 to 2013. He served as the representative of Cavite's 6th congressional district from 2013 to 2022.

Biography 
Luis Alandy Ferrer IV was born to parents Luis Ferrer III and Teresing Ferrer. His older brother, Antonio A. Ferrer, is currently Cavite's 6th District representative, and also a former mayor of General Trias. His father is Luis S. Ferrer III, a former provincial Vice-Governor. His grandfather, Luis Y. Ferrer Jr., and great-grandfather, Luis O. Ferrer Sr. were former governors of Cavite. He is related to Luis Alandy.

References 

Living people
Year of birth missing (living people)
Filipino Freemasons
Members of the House of Representatives of the Philippines from Cavite
Politicians from Cavite
Lakas–CMD (1991) politicians
National Unity Party (Philippines) politicians